Sotira is a town in the Famagusta District of Cyprus, west of Paralimni. In 2011, it had a population of 5,474.

Gallery

See also 
 Onisilos Sotira, the town's football club

References 

Municipalities in Famagusta District